Serradigitus is a genus of sawfinger scorpions in the family Vaejovidae. There are more than 20 described species in Serradigitus.

Species
These 25 species belong to the genus Serradigitus:

 Serradigitus adcocki (Williams, 1980)
 Serradigitus agilis Sissom & Stockwell, 1991
 Serradigitus allredi
 Serradigitus armadentis (Williams, 1980)
 Serradigitus baueri (Gertsch, 1958)
 Serradigitus bechteli (Williams, 1980)
 Serradigitus calidus (Soleglad, 1974)
 Serradigitus dwyeri (Williams, 1980)
 Serradigitus gertschi (Williams, 1968)
 Serradigitus gigantaensis (Williams, 1980)
 Serradigitus gramenestris (Williams, 1970)
 Serradigitus haradoni (Williams, 1980)
 Serradigitus harbisoni
 Serradigitus hearnei (Williams, 1980)
 Serradigitus joshuaensis (Soleglad, 1972)
 Serradigitus littoralis (Williams, 1980)
 Serradigitus minutis (Williams, 1970)
 Serradigitus minutus (Williams, 1970)
 Serradigitus miscionei Ayrey, 2011
 Serradigitus pacificus (Williams, 1980)
 Serradigitus polisi
 Serradigitus subtilimanus
 Serradigitus torridus Williams & Berke, 1986
 Serradigitus wupatkiensis (Stahnke, 1940)
 Serradigitus yaqui Sissom & Stockwell, 1991

References

Further reading

 

Vaejovidae
Scorpion genera